Elections to the United States House of Representatives in Florida for the 52nd Congress were held November 4, 1890.

Background
At the time of the 1890 election, Florida had two Representatives in the House of Representatives, both Democrats.

Election results
Robert H. M. Davidson did not win renomination for Congress.

See also
United States House of Representatives elections, 1890

References

1890
Florida
United States House of Representatives